Musca is a small constellation in the deep southern sky.

Musca may also refer to:

People
 Xavier Musca (born 1960), French economist
 Mona Muscă (born 1949), Romanian philologist and politician

Other uses
 Musca, a 2021 album by music artist Herbert
 Musca Borealis, first described as "Musca", an asterism and obsolete constellation in the northern sky
 Mușca, a village in Lupșa, Alba County, Romania
 Musca (fly), a genus of flies
 Viberti Musca 1, the "Musca 1", an Italian airplane produced by Ali Verberti SpA